Spain competed at the 2016 European Athletics Championships in Amsterdam, Netherlands, between 6 and 10 July 2016.

The final selection was announced by the RFEA.

Medals

Results

Men
Track & road events

Field events

Combined events – Decathlon

Women
Track & road events

Field events

References

http://www.rfea.es/sirfea/ficheros/comunicados/documentos/2016628135341.pdf

European Athletics Championships
2016
Nations at the 2016 European Athletics Championships